Piper Eressea Kerman (born September 28, 1969) is an American author. She was indicted in 1998 on charges of felonious money-laundering activities, and sentenced to 15 months' detention in a federal correctional facility, of which she eventually served 13 months. Her memoir of her prison experiences, Orange Is the New Black: My Year in a Women's Prison (2010), was adapted into the critically-acclaimed Netflix original comedy-drama series Orange Is the New Black (2013). Since leaving prison, Kerman has spoken widely about women in prison and problems with the federal prison system. She now works as a communication strategist for non-profit organizations.

Early life and education 
Kerman was born in Boston into a family with a number of attorneys, doctors and educators. She graduated from Swampscott High School in Swampscott, Massachusetts, in 1987, and Smith College in 1992. Kerman is a self-described WASP; however, she had a paternal grandfather who was Russian-Jewish.

Criminal career 
In 1993, Kerman became romantically involved with Catherine Cleary Wolters (Nora Janson in her memoir: Laura Prepon's character Alex Vause in the series), a heroin dealer working for an alleged Nigerian kingpin. Kerman laundered money for the drug operation.

In 1998, Kerman was indicted for money laundering and drug trafficking and she pled guilty. Starting in 2004, she served 13 months of a 15-month sentence at FCI Danbury, a minimum security prison located in Danbury, Connecticut.

During her sentence, she built her website "The Pipe Bomb" to document her life behind bars.

Later career 
Kerman's best-selling memoir about her experiences in prison, Orange Is the New Black: My Year in a Women's Prison, was published by Spiegel & Grau on April 6, 2010. A television adaptation of the same name created by Jenji Kohan, the Emmy award-winning creator of Weeds, premiered on July 11, 2013, on Netflix and aired for seven seasons. Kerman's character in the series ("Piper Chapman") is played by Taylor Schilling.
Orange is the New Black has received critical acclaim and won four Emmy Awards.

Kerman serves on the board of the Women's Prison Association and is frequently invited to speak to students of creative writing, criminology, gender and women's studies law, and sociology, and to groups, like the American Correctional Association's Disproportionate Minority Confinement Task Force, federal probation officers, public defenders, justice reform advocates and volunteers, book club and formerly and currently incarcerated people.

On February 10, 2014, Kerman received the 2014 Justice Trailblazer Award from the John Jay College of Criminal Justice Center on Media, Crime & Justice.

On February 25, 2014, Kerman testified at a hearing on "Reassessing Solitary Confinement" before the Senate Judiciary Subcommittee on the Constitution, Civil Rights and Human Rights chaired by Assistant Majority Leader Dick Durbin.

On August 4, 2015, Kerman testified at a hearing on "Oversight of the Bureau of Prisons: First-Hand Accounts of Challenges Facing the Federal Prison System" before the Senate Homeland Security and Governmental Affairs Committee chaired by Senator Ron Johnson.

Since 2015, Kerman has worked as a communications strategist for nonprofits.

Since her prison sentence, Kerman has spoken publicly many times on behalf of women in corrections and about her experience.

In 2019, she appeared as a guest in the last episode of Orange Is the New Black in the last scene in the Ohio prison, when Piper visited Alex. Kerman sat two seats to the left of Alex as a convict visited by her husband (in real life). She makes a cameo appearance in the show’s opening credits as the convict who blinks.

Personal life 
Kerman has said, "I'm bisexual, so I'm a part of the gay community (LGBT+)". She came out around the age of 18, and identified herself as a lesbian during most of her youth. On May 21, 2006, Kerman married writer Larry Smith.  Kerman and Smith live in Columbus, Ohio, and she teaches writing classes at the Marion Correctional Institution and the Ohio Reformatory for Women in nearby Marysville, Ohio. She does not identify with any religion and was awarded the 'Humanist Heroine of the Year Award' from the 'Humanist Hub' group at Harvard University.

Works 
 Orange Is the New Black: My Year in a Women's Prison
 Finding My Way Back

See also
Teresa Giudice, reality star and media personality whose prison memoir, Turning the Tables (2015), describes her 15-month incarceration from 2015 to 2016, for fraud, at the Federal Correctional Institution, Danbury, CT 
Martha Stewart, celebrity who was incarcerated from 2004 to 2005, for offenses related to insider trading, at Federal Prison Camp, Alderson, WV

References

External links 
 
 thepipebomb.com - The website about her incarceration (mentioned in location 945/4958 of the OITNB ebook)
 
 
 

1969 births
People from West Long Branch, New Jersey
Smith College alumni
American people convicted of drug offenses
People convicted of money laundering
American memoirists
Writers from Boston
Bisexual women
American LGBT rights activists
Bisexual memoirists
Living people
Prison reformers
LGBT people from Massachusetts
American people of Russian-Jewish descent
Orange Is the New Black